1 Thessalonians 2 is the second chapter of the First Epistle to the Thessalonians in the New Testament of the Christian Bible. It is authored by Paul the Apostle, likely written in Corinth in about 50–51 CE for the church in Thessalonica. This chapter includes a review of Paul's previous ministry in Thessalonica and records his desire to visit them again.

Text 
The original text was written in Koine Greek. This chapter is divided into 20 verses.

Textual witnesses
Some early manuscripts containing the text of this chapter are:
 Papyrus 46 (c. AD 200; extant verses 1–3)
 Papyrus 65 (3rd century)
 Codex Vaticanus (325–350)
 Codex Sinaiticus (330–360)
 Codex Alexandrinus (400–440)
 Codex Ephraemi Rescriptus (c. 450; extant verses 1–8)
 Codex Freerianus (c. 450; extant verses 7–9, 14–16)
 Codex Claromontanus (c. 550)

The divine basis for Paul's initial visit (2:1–4) 
Paul reminds the believers about the fruitful works he started in Thessalonica, despite the suffering (Greek: hubristhentes, "physically assaulted and dishonored") he and his co-workers (presumably Silvanus and Timothy) experienced in Philippi, that with the help of God (lit. 'in our God') the gospel was preached in the midst of opposition (Greek: agōn). In the account in the Acts of the Apostles, Paul and Silas reach Thessalonica at the start of chapter 17.

Verse 1
For you yourselves know, brethren, that our coming to you was not in vain.
Theologian Philip Esler describes the reference to "brethren" ("brothers and sisters" in the New Revised Standard Version) as "fictive kinship". The words "you yourselves know" are followed up three more times within the first few lines of this section (verses 2, 5 and 11). Protestant theologian Heinrich Meyer thinks the words are "involuntarily added by Paul, by reason of the lively feeling with which he places himself, in thought, in the time whereof he speaks".

The behavior and example of the people (2:5–12)

Verse 10 
 You are witnesses, and God also, how devoutly and justly and blamelessly we behaved ourselves among you who believe;

 "You are witnesses, and God also": the church is the witness for the more open part and God for the more secret part of all their actions.

 "How devoutly [NKJV; KJV: 'holily'], and justly, and blamelessly [NKJV; KJV: 'unblamably'] we behaved ourselves among you who believe": The Syriac version combines the verses to read, "ye are witnesses, and God also, how purely and justly we preached unto you the Gospel of God, and how unblamable we were among all that believed"; referring the former part to the purity and integrity in which they preached the Gospel, and the latter to their unblemished conduct among the believers; and it was likewise "just", that is, righteous in the sight of God through the justifying righteousness of Christ, and in consequence of this lived righteously before men; as well as "unblamable"; not without sin, but by the grace of God, there was nothing material to be alleged against them, or any just cause of blame to be laid either on their persons or their ministry.

The response of the Thessalonians (2:13–16) 
Paul gratefully recalls the acceptance of God's words by the Thessalonians, but condemns some Jews, classified as 'the Judeans' (Greek: Ioudaioi; specifically for a group of Jews who was oriented to Judea, to Jerusalem and the temple within it), who persecute Christians and were connected by Paul to the killing of Jesus and the prophets.

Authenticity

The authenticity of 1 Thessalonians 2:13–16 has been disputed by some. The following arguments are made against its authenticity based on its content:
 It is perceived to be theologically incompatible with Paul's other epistles: elsewhere Paul attributed Jesus's death to the "rulers of this age" rather than to the Jews, and elsewhere Paul writes that the Jews have not been abandoned by God, for "all Israel will be saved". According to 1 Thes 1:10, the wrath of God is still to come; it is not something that has already shown itself.
 There were no extensive historical persecutions of Christians by Jews in Palestine prior to the first Jewish war.
 The use of the concept of imitation in 1 Thes. 2.14 is singular.
 The aorist eftasen ("has overtaken") refers to the destruction of Jerusalem.
 The syntax of these verses deviates from that of the surrounding context.

However, the authenticity of the passage has continued to find defenders over the last two centuries, and in the last thirty years the common opinion has swung decisively in favor of authenticity.

Paul's desire to visit the Thessalonians (2:17–20) 
In these verses, Paul expresses his eagerness to be physically with the Thessalonians again, even as he was hindered to do so on a number of occasions.

See also
 Acts 161 Corinthians 4Galatians 12 Timothy 4

References

Sources

External links
 King James Bible - Wikisource
English Translation with Parallel Latin Vulgate
Online Bible at GospelHall.org (ESV, KJV, Darby, American Standard Version, Bible in Basic English)
Multiple bible versions at Bible Gateway (NKJV, NIV, NRSV etc.)

02